Attention is a studio album by GusGus, released in 2002. The band recorded the album as a quartet.

The album peaked at #19 on Billboard'''s Top Dance/Electronic Albums chart.

Critical receptionPopMatters wrote that the album "continues in the GusGus tradition of decent, thinking-man's dance music ... Attention fuses their signature style with an electro-pop/'80s vibe." Wired wrote: "Stocked with cathedral-ready incantations from new vocalist Earth (aka Urdur Hakonardottir), old-school rave references, and seductive techno and house rhythms, Attention grabs you by the hips and doesn't stop shaking." The Washington Post'' wrote that "the emphasis tilts toward steady beats, fuzztone bleeps and earthy vocals."

Track listing 
All songs written by GusGus.

References

2002 albums
GusGus albums